The Sign of the Spade is a 1916 silent film drama directed by Murdock MacQuarrie and starring Allan Forrest and Helene Rosson. It was distributed through the Mutual Film Company.

Cast
Allan Forrest - Howard Lamson
Helene Rosson - Shirley Lamson
Warren Ellsworth - Wallace Thorpe
Harvey Clark - Old Deefy/James Fenton (*as Harvey Clarke)
Clarence Burton - Dave Harmon
Robert Miller - Theodore Roosevelt Jenkins
George Gebhardt - Tony Rimonetti

Preservation status
The film is preserved (in nitrate) at the Library of Congress.

References

External links

1916 films
American silent feature films
American Film Company films
American black-and-white films
Silent American drama films
1916 drama films
1910s American films